Feichtner is a surname. Notable people with the surname include:

Anton Feichtner (born 1942),  German television actor
Dmitry Feichtner-Kozlov (born 1972), Russian-German mathematician
Eva-Maria Feichtner (born 1972), German mathematician
Franz Adam Feichtner, also known as "Veichtner" (1741–1822), German violinist and composer of the classical era
Thomas Feichtner (born 1970), Austrian industrial designer

References